Qurshaqlu (also Romanized as Qūrshāqlū; also known as Ghoor Shaghloo, Kūrshāhelī, Kurshahli, Kurshakhli, Qūrshāqlī, Qūrshāqlū-ye Gaj Lavāt, and Qūrshōqlū) is a village in Gejlarat-e Sharqi Rural District, Aras District, Poldasht County, West Azerbaijan Province, Iran. At the 2006 census, its population was 31, in 8 families.

References 

Populated places in Poldasht County